Caprices is a 1942 French comedy film starring Danielle Darrieux and Albert Préjean, and was directed by Léo Joannon, who co-wrote screenplay with André Cayatte and Jacques Companéez for the German run film company Continental Films who made films to take the place of banned American films. It was released on VHS by TF1 Vidéo in France on 1 January 1998.

Plot
It tells the story of two young rich people. Famous actress poses as a poor florist, and a distinguished society man camouflages himself as forger and swindler. This game leads them to make close relations in a series of adventures. Finally, the truth is revealed, and the couple return to normalcy but promise not to separate any more.

Cast
 Danielle Darrieux as Lise
 Albert Préjean as Philippe
 Jean Parédès as Constant
 Fred Pasquali as the film director
 Germaine Reuver as the mother
 Jean Brochard as the father

Notes

External links

Caprices at Gaumont.fr

1942 films
French black-and-white films
1942 romantic comedy films
Films directed by Léo Joannon
French romantic comedy films
1940s French-language films
Continental Films films
1940s French films